Aethalida owadai is a moth of the family Erebidae. It was described by Vladimir Viktorovitch Dubatolov and Yasunori Kishida in 2005. It is found on Selayar Island and Flores in Indonesia.

Subspecies 
Aethalida owadai owadai Dubatolov & Kishida, 2005 (Indonesia: Selayar Island)
Aethalida owadai floresiensis Spitsyn & I. Bolotov, 2016 (Indonesia: Flores)

References

Moths described in 2005
Spilosomina
Moths of Indonesia